Luis Humberto Preti Maldonado (born January 2, 1983) is a retired Ecuadorian football goalkeeper.

Club career
He has spent the majority of his career at LDU Quito as a product of its youth system. Although he began making senior squad appearances in 2002, he saw little playing time as a back-up goalie. He was the second back-up for the squad when it won the 2008 Copa Libertadores. Following the Copa Libertadores, he was traded to another Quito club, Universidad Católica, who at the time were in the top-tier Serie A. He did not see playing time again in 2008. In 2009, he became the starting goalkeeper for the club, which had been relegated from the previous season.

Honors
LDU Quito
Serie A: 2003, 2005 Apertura, 2007
Copa Libertadores: 2008

External links
FEF card 

1983 births
Living people
Sportspeople from Guayaquil
Association football goalkeepers
Ecuadorian footballers
L.D.U. Quito footballers
C.D. Universidad Católica del Ecuador footballers